Central of Georgia Railroad Terminal or Central of Georgia Depot may refer to:

(by state then city)
Central of Georgia Depot (Andalusia, Alabama), listed on the NRHP in Alabama
Central of Georgia Railroad Terminal (700 12th St., Columbus, Georgia), listed on the NRHP in Georgia
Central of Georgia Railroad Terminal (1200 6th Ave., Columbus, Georgia), listed on the NRHP in Georgia
Central of Georgia Depot and Trainshed, Savannah, Georgia, listed on the NRHP in Georgia
Central of Georgia Railroad: Savannah Shops and Terminal Facilities, Savannah, GA, listed on the NRHP in Georgia
Central of Georgia Railway Company Shop Property, Savannah, GA, listed on the NRHP in Georgia

See also
Central of Georgia Railway